Todessehnsucht is the second studio album by the heavy metal band Atrocity. It was released in 1992. At the time the band still played death metal with a technical edge.

History
The album was released in some countries with the title Longing for Death, which is a translation of the original German title. The album was released in 1992 by Roadrunner Records.

The final track on the album, "Archangel", is a cover of Death; however the lyrics are re-written as the original ones are not available.

Track listing
  "Todessehnsucht"   – 3:50
  "Godless Years"  – 5:40
  "Unspoken Names"  – 5:27
  "Defiance"  – 4:58
  "Triumph at Dawn"  – 4:01
  "Introduction"  – 1:35
  "Sky Turned Red"  – 6:24
  "Necropolis"  – 4:11
  "A Prison Called Earth"  – 6:06
  "Todessehnsucht (Reprise)"  – 2:05
 "Archangel  (Death cover)   "  – 3:28

Personnel
Alexander Krull - vocals
Mathias Röderer - guitar
Richard Scharf - guitar
Oliver Klasen - bass
Michael Schwarz - drums

References

External links
 Roadrunner Records Review

Atrocity (band) albums
1992 albums